This article refers to sports broadcasting contracts in Hungary. For a list of broadcasting rights in other countries, see Sports television broadcast contracts.

Football

National teams 

Hungary national football team: MTVA (2011-2028)
FIFA World Cups: MTVA (2014-2026)
 FIFA World Qualifiers and UEFA European Championship Qualifiers: MTVA (2011-2028) (only Hungary matches), Spíler TV (other matches) (2022-2028)
UEFA European Championship: MTVA (1960-2028)
UEFA Nations League: MTVA (2018-2028) (only Hungary matches, one Semi final and Final), Spíler TV (other matches, semi Finals) (2022-2028)

Clubs

Leagues 

Nemzeti Bajnokság I: MTVA (2015-2025)
Nemzeti Bajnokság II: MTVA (2015-)
UEFA Champions League: MTVA (First pick on Tuesdays and Wednesdays; exclusive Semi finals and Final, Highlights) (2015-2024), Sport TV (Other matches, Highlights) (2021-2024)
UEFA Europa League: MTVA (First pick, exclusive Final, Highlights), RTL Group (Other matches, Highlights) (2021-2024)
UEFA Europa Conference League: MTVA (First pick, exclusive Final, Highlights), RTL Group (Other matches, Highlights) (2021-2024)
Premier League: Spíler TV (2016-2025) (7-8 matches live per round), ARENA4 (2022-2025) (2-3 matches live per round)
La Liga: Spíler TV (2018-2025)
Serie A: Sport TV (2021-2024)
Bundesliga: Spíler TV (2021-2022), ARENA4 (2021-2025)
Ligue 1: MATCH4 (2018-2024)
Championship: ARENA4 (2020-)
2. Bundesliga: Spíler TV (2021-2022), ARENA4 (2021-2025), MATCH4 (2022-2025)
Major League Soccer: ARENA4 (2022-), MATCH4
Austrian Football Bundesliga: ARENA4
Scottish Championship: ARENA4, MATCH4
Allsvenskan: Eurosport 
Eliteserien: Eurosport

Cups

FIFA Club World Cup: MTVA (2019-)
UEFA Super Cup: MTVA (2015-2024)
Magyar Kupa: MTVA (2015-)
The FA Cup: Spíler TV (2019-25)
Football League Cup: Digi Sport (2015-2021)
FA Community Shield: Spíler TV (2019-25)
Copa del Rey: Sport TV (2020-)
Spanish Super Cup: Digi Sport (2020-21)
Coppa Italia: Sport TV (2018-)
Supercoppa Italiana: Sport TV (2018-)
DFB Pokal: Sport TV (2015-)

Multi-disciplines events
Olympic Games: MTVA (1960-2032), Eurosport (2018, 2020, 2022, 2024, 2026, 2028, 2030, 2032)
European Games: Digi Sport (2015)

Motor sport
Formula One: MTVA (2012-2025)
FIA Formula 2 Championship: MTVA
FIA Formula 3 Championship: MTVA
Porsche Supercup: Digi Sport
FIA Formula E Championship: Eurosport (Hungary)
Red Bull Air Race World Championship: MTVA
Moto GP: ARENA4 (2020-), MATCH4 (2022-)
DTM: Digi Sport
IndyCar: ARENA4 (2020-), MATCH4 (2022-)
NASCAR: ARENA4, MATCH4

American Football

NFL: ARENA4, MATCH4 (2020-)
NCAA: ARENA4 (2020-)
European League of Football: ARENA4, MATCH4 (2022-)

Baseball

MLB: Sport TV (2020-)

Cycling
Tour de France: Eurosport
Giro d'Italia: Eurosport
Vuelta a España: Eurosport

Aquatics
FINA World Aquatics Championships: MTVA
LEN European Aquatics Championships: MTVA
FINA Swimming World Cup: Sport TV
European Water Polo Championship: MTVA
Hungary men's national water polo team: MTVA
Hungary women's national water polo team: MTVA
LEN Champions League: MTVA, Digi Sport
Országos Bajnokság I (men's water polo): MTVA

Basketball
Nemzeti Bajnokság I/A (men's basketball): MTVA
Hungary national basketball team:MTVA
Euroleague: Digi Sport
NBA: Sport TV
Liga ACB: ARENA4

Handball
World Men's Handball Championship: MTVA
World Women's Handball Championship: MTVA
European Men's Handball Championship: MTVA (only Hungary matches and the final), Sport TV (other matches)
European Women's Handball Championship: MTVA (only Hungary matches and the final), Sport TV (other matches)
Hungary men's national handball team: MTVA
Hungary women's national handball team: MTVA
EHF Champions League: Sport TV , MTVA (Highlights)
EHF Cup: Sport TV
Women's EHF Champions League: Sport TV, MTVA (Highlights)
Women's EHF Challenge Cup: Sport TV
Nemzeti Bajnokság I (men's handball): MTVA
Nemzeti Bajnokság I (women's handball): MTVA
Handball-Bundesliga: Sport TV (2018 - )
SEHA Liga: Spiler TV, Digi Sport (2020-)

Ice Hockey
NHL: ARENA 4, MATCH 4 (2020-)

Tennis
Australian Open: Eurosport
French Open: Eurosport
Wimbledon: Eurosport (2017-2019)
US Open: Eurosport (-2022)
Hungary Davis Cup team: MTVA
Davis Cup: Sport TV
ATP World Tour Masters 1000: Digi Sport (2017-2021)
ATP World Tour 500 series: Digi Sport
ATP World Tour 250 series: Digi Sport
ATP World Tour Finals: Digi Sport
WTA Premier tournaments: MATCH4

Boxing
Dream Boxing: DAZN: October 2022 to October 2025, all fights

Kickboxing
King of Kings: DAZN: October 2022 to October 2025, all fights

Mixed Martial Arts
Bellator MMA: Eurosport, ARENA 4, MATCH4
Bushido MMA: DAZN: October 2022 to October 2025, all fights
Ultimate Fighting Championship: Eurosport, Sport TV

Professional Wrestling
WWE Raw: Eurosport, ARENA 4, MATCH4
WWE SmackDown: Eurosport, ARENA 4, MATCH4
WWE PPVs: Eurosport
WWE Experience: Viasat 6

In the past

FIFA World Cups: Magyar Televízió (1962-2002, 2010), RTL Klub (2006)
Hungary national football team: Magyar Televízió (1960-2003), RTL Klub (1997, 2000, 2004-2009), Sport TV (2000-2010) (some matches)
Nemzeti Bajnokság I: Magyar Televízió (?-2003), RTL Klub (2004-2006), Duna Televízió (2006-10), Sport TV (2000-2015), ATV (Hungary) (2003)
UEFA Champions League: Magyar Televízió (1992-2003, 2006-09) (+ matches in the qualification rounds, where Hungarian clubs involved), Sport TV (2000-2003, 2012-18), Viasat 3 (2003-09), TV2 (2009-12), Digi Sport (2009-15)
UEFA Europa League: (UEFA Cup): Magyar Televízió (1997-2004) (only Finals and matches in the qualification rounds, where Hungarian clubs involved), Sport TV (2000-2009, 2018-2021), Digi Sport (2009-21), Story 4 (2009-15), RTL Group (2015-18)
UEFA Cup Winners' Cup: Magyar Televízió (1981-88, 1991, 1993, 1996-99) (only Finals and matches in the qualification rounds, where Hungarian clubs involved)
European Cup: Magyar Televízió (?-1992)
Premier League: Sport TV (2001-2007), Eurosport (2007-2010), Digi Sport (2010-2016), (2019-2022)
Bundesliga: HBO (1996-97), Sport TV (2000-2006, 2018-21), Sportklub (2006-2009), Eurosport (2009-18), Magyar Televízió (2003-04) (Only Highlights)
La Liga: Sport TV (2000-2018)
Serie A: Filmnet (1996-97), Sport TV (2000-2010), Digi Sport (2010-2012, 2014-21), Sportklub (2012-2015)
FA Cup: Magyar Televízió (1998, 1999 - Only Finals), Sport TV (2000-2012, 2015-19)
Formula One: Magyar Televízió (1976-2001) (At the beginning, not all the races were broadcast - in these cases only highlights were broadcast.), RTL Klub (2002-2011)

Hungary